The Saudi Arabia national football team represent Saudi Arabia in men's international football. They are known as Al-Suqour Al-Khodhur (The Green Falcons) in reference to their traditional colours of green and white and represent both FIFA and the Asian Football Confederation (AFC).

Considered one of Asia's most successful national teams, Saudi Arabia have won the AFC Asian Cup three times (1984, 1988 and 1996), reached a joint record six Asian Cup finals and have qualified for the FIFA World Cup on six occasions since debuting at the 1994 tournament. Saudi Arabia are the first Asian team to reach the final of a senior FIFA competition at the 1992 King Fahd Cup, which would eventually become the FIFA Confederations Cup. Only Australia and Japan managed to repeat this feat in 1997 and 2001 respectively, though Australia achieved it when they were a member of the OFC.

At the 1994 World Cup, under the leadership of Jorge Solari, Saudi Arabia beat both Belgium and Morocco in the group stage before falling to Sweden in the Round of 16. Thus, they became the second Arab team in history to reach the round of 16 of a World Cup after Morocco at the 1986 FIFA World Cup and one of the few Asian national football teams (others being Australia, Japan, South Korea and North Korea) to accomplish such a feat to date.

During the 2022 FIFA World Cup, Saudi Arabia caused a large upset when they beat eventual champions Argentina 2–1, the first time Argentina lost to an Asian representative in a FIFA World Cup. However, Saudi Arabia then lost the following matches against Poland and Mexico, and were knocked out 4th in the group stage of the World Cup.

In 2027, Saudi Arabia will host the AFC Asian Cup. It will be the first time that the nation has ever hosted an Asian Cup.

History

Early history
The idea of a Saudi national team first came about in 1951, when a Saudi XI team consisting of players from Al-Wehda and Al-Ahli took part in a friendly game against the Egyptian Ministry of Health on 27 June at the Al-Saban Stadium in Jeddah. The following day, the Egyptians took on a Saudi team made up of players from Al-Ittihad and Al-Hilal in Al-Bahri in the same city. On 2 August, His Royal Highness Prince Abdullah Al-Faisal organized a third friendly with the Egyptian team against Saudi Arabia with players from Al-Wehda, and Al-Ahli. By then, the idea of a national select team to represent the Kingdom of Saudi Arabia was already in full flow, and in 1953 the first-ever Saudi team traveled to play friendly matches abroad. The same year, a Saudi team traveled to Damascus to play friendly matches as part of then-Crown Prince Saud bin Abdulaziz’s visit to the country in April.

In 1957, the Saudi national team took part in their first international tournament at the 2nd Pan-Arab Games in Beirut, where King Saud was invited to attend the opening ceremony and the inauguration of the Camille Chamoun Sports City Stadium with Lebanese President Camille Chamoun on 18 October. Abdulmajeed Kayal scored for the Saudis while Levon Altonian netted for the home side.

Debuting successes and subsequent declines
Though their football federation was established in 1956, the Saudi Arabia national team did not participate in a tournament until they qualified for the AFC Asian Cup in 1984. Since then, they reached the next four consecutive Asian Cup finals, winning two of them (1988 and 1996). They have qualified for every Asian Cup since, reaching the final in 2007.

Saudi Arabia qualified for their first FIFA World Cup in 1994 under the leadership of Argentine manager Jorge Solari and talents like Saeed Al-Owairan and Sami Al-Jaber, reinforced by national veteran Majed Abdullah as team captain. Wins against Belgium and Morocco in the group stage led to a match-up against Sweden in the round of 16, a 3–1 loss. Saudi Arabia qualified for the next three World Cups, but failed to win a match in any of them; the team placed last in 2002 without scoring a goal, while conceding 12, including eight against Germany.

Revival, history written, but fall short
Saudi Arabia secured qualification for the 2018 World Cup, their first in 12 years, ahead of Australia. Hosts Russia annihilated them in the opening match 5–0, making this the second largest victory of any host nation at the FIFA World Cup. Saudi Arabia then lost 1–0 to a Luis Suarez-led Uruguay, the eventual group winners. Although they were already eliminated, they managed to salvage some pride by winning their final group stage match against Red Sea neighbours Egypt.

After the 2018 World Cup, Saudi Arabia participated in the 2019 Asian Cup, held in the United Arab Emirates; the team finished second in the group stage, after falling to Qatar in the final game, leading to a showdown against Japan in the round of 16. The Saudis dominated the whole game, but ultimately lost 1–0 due to poor finishing.

On 15 October 2019, Saudi Arabia played its first-ever game with Palestine in the West Bank; the game marked a change in policy for Saudi Arabia, which has previously played matches against the Palestinian team in third-party countries. The visit was condemned by some Palestinian activists, who considered the game as a start of normalizing the relations between Saudi Arabia and Israel, but it was viewed by the Palestinian National Authority as a support for their sovereignty over the West Bank. The game ended in a scoreless draw.

Saudi Arabia qualified for the 2022 FIFA World Cup in Qatar, the first to be held in the Middle East, by topping their qualifying group and were drawn against Argentina, Poland and Mexico. In the opening game of their group, they defeated a much fancied Argentina side 2–1 within just five minutes in the early of the second half with goals from Saleh Al-Shehri and the beautiful curl of Salem Al-Dawsari, ending an Argentine unbeaten streak of 36 games dating back to 2019. The Saudi King declared a Holiday after the win over Argentina and Saudi fans celebrated with mocking words against Lionel Messi, Argentine team and the other opponents. They then lost their next match against Poland, 2–0. Piotr Zieliński broke Saudi hearts with a goal in 39th minute; Salem Al-Dawsari's penalty was saved by Polish goalkeeper Wojciech Szczęsny in the first half when the score was 1–0 while Abdulellah Al-Malki made a mistake to allow Robert Lewandowski to score his first World Cup goal. This made Saudi require a win against Mexico to advance to the Round of 16 regardless of the Argentina-Poland result. Facing a team that was also playing its qualification in this last game in the same Lusail Iconic Stadium, Saudi Arabia opted to play all-out attack by fielding three strikers in front, but this proved fatal as the Saudis failed to repeat their inaugural achievement and ended up losing the match 2–1 after goals from Henry Martín and Luis Chávez, conceding both goals in just a similar five minutes span (the same span Saudi Arabia shocked Argentina) in the second half. As a result, Saudi Arabia finished bottom in their group and were eliminated from the 2022 World Cup in the group stages at the despair of Saudi fans, as Saudi Arabia's knockout stage waiting hurt extended to 32 years since their only successful qualification in 1994. Moreover, the defeat also nailed the coffin to West Asian football, as all three representatives from West Asia in the first World Cup in the region (Qatar, Iran, Saudi Arabia) were all eliminated. Still, as Argentina subsequently walked on to eventually claim the 2022 FIFA World Cup title, the shock win Saudi Arabia gained against Argentina, the only team of the tournament to have beaten the Albiceleste, was a major consolation for the country's early World Cup exit.

Kits and crests

Traditionally, Saudi Arabia's home kit is white with green trim, and the away kit is green with white trim (flag colors).

Kit suppliers

Rivalries

Saudi Arabia's main rivals are mostly from the same Persian/Arabian Gulf, notably Iran, Iraq, Qatar, Kuwait and the United Arab Emirates.

Due to historical reasons, matches against Iran have been frequently followed and seen by Saudis as the most important rival. This stems from the strong hatred between Saudi Arabia and Iran, in particular in recent years due to historical enmities. Iran is leading the series by one game. Saudi Arabia has 4 wins, 6 draws, and 5 losses against Iran. It's one of 10 most heated rivalries with political influence.

Saudi Arabia's other heated rival is Iraq. However, the rivalry only began in the 1970s. Due to the Gulf War, in which Iraq invaded Saudi Arabia's ally Kuwait, Saudi Arabia and Iraq eventually became bitter rivals fighting to salvage Arab pride. The two countries since then have an up-and-down in relations, often ranged from lack of cooperation and political confrontation. Iraq almost pulled out of the 21st Arabian Gulf Cup after the country was disallowed to host the competition in a move believed to be motivated by Saudi Arabia.

Outside the West Asian border, Saudi Arabia also has other rivalries with fellow Asian powerhouses like Japan, Australia and South Korea; as well as having rivalries with Arab opponents of North Africa, mostly Algeria, Egypt, Morocco and Tunisia.

Venues
Historically, Saudi Arabia played most of their home matches in King Fahd International Stadium, located in the capital Riyadh. The stadium was also where some of Saudi Arabia's most important fixtures were when the country hosted the first three King Fahd Cups (predecessor of the Confederations Cup). The stadium was also home to some of Saudi Arabia's big games in the FIFA World Cup qualifiers.

Saudi Arabia started to diversify the use of venues from outside Riyadh in the 2000s, with the 2002 FIFA World Cup qualifiers first round played in Prince Mohamed bin Fahd Stadium in Dammam and the second round played entirely in Prince Faisal bin Fahd Stadium. In the 2006 FIFA World Cup qualifiers second round against Sri Lanka and at the first fixture against Uzbekistan in the third round, Saudi Arabia played again in Prince Mohamed bin Fahd Stadium. It was accelerated from 2010s onward as Saudi Arabia began to play frequent home fixtures in newly built King Abdullah Sports City in Jeddah and Mrsool Park also in Riyadh.

Results and fixtures 
The following is a list of match results from the previous 12 months, as well as any future matches that have been scheduled.

2022

2023

Coaching staff

Coaching history

 Abdulrahman Fawzi (1957–1961)
 Ali Chaouach (1967–1969)
 George Skinner (1970)
 Mohammed Sheita (1970–1972)
 Taha Ismail (1972–1974)
 Abdo Saleh El Wahsh 1974)
 Ferenc Puskás (1975)
 Bill McGarry (1976–1977)
 Ronnie Allen (1978)
 Danny Allison (1978)
 David Woodfield (1979)
 Rubens Minelli (1980)
 Mario Zagallo (1981–1984)
 Khalil Ibrahim Al-Zayani (1984–1986)
 Castilho (1986)
 Osvaldo (1987)
 Carlos Galletti (1988)
 Omar Borrás (1988)
 Carlos Alberto Parreira (1988–1990)
 Metin Türel (1990)
 Claudinho Garcia (1990–1992)
 Veloso (1992)
 Nelsinho Rosa (1992)
 Candinho (1993)
 Leo Beenhakker (1993–1994)
 Mohammed Al-Kharashy (1994, 1995, 1998)
 Ivo Wortmann (1994)
 Jorge Solari (1994)
 Zé Mário (1995–1996)
 Nelo Vingada (1996–1997)
 Otto Pfister (1998)
 Carlos Alberto Parreira (1998)
 Otto Pfister (1999)
 Milan Máčala (1999–2000)
 Nasser Al-Johar (2000, 2001–2002, 2004, 2008–2009, 2011)
 Slobodan Santrač (2001)
 Gerard van der Lem (2002–2004)
 Martin Koopman (2002)
 Gabriel Calderon (2004–2005)
 Marcos Paquetá (2006–2007)
 Hélio dos Anjos (2007–2008)
 José Peseiro (2009–2011)
 Rogério Lourenço (2011)
 Frank Rijkaard (2011–2013)
 Juan Ramón López Caro (2013–2014)
 Cosmin Olăroiu (2014–2015)
 Faisal Al Baden (2015)
 Bert van Marwijk (2015–2017)
 Edgardo Bauza (2017)
  Juan Antonio Pizzi (2017–2019)
 Youssef Anbar (2019)
 Hervé Renard (2019–)
 Laurent Bonadéi (2021)
 Saad Al-Shehri (2023)

Players

Current squad
The following 26 players were called up for the friendlies against Venezuela and Bolivia.
 Match date: 24 & 28 March 2023
 Opposition: , & .
 Caps and goals are correct as of 12 January 2023, after the match against , as recognized by SAFF.

Recent call-ups
The following players have also been called up to the Saudi Arabia squad within the last 12 months.

COV Player withdrew from the squad due to contracting COVID-19.
INJ Player withdrew from the squad due to an injury.
PRE Preliminary squad.
RET Retired from the national team.
SUS Player is serving a suspension.
WD Player withdrew from the squad due to non-injury issue.

Player records

Players in bold are still active with Saudi Arabia.

Competitive record

*Denotes draws includes knockout matches decided on penalty shootouts. Red border indicates that the tournament was hosted on home soil. Gold, silver, bronze backgrounds indicate 1st, 2nd and 3rd finishes respectively. Bold text indicates best finish in tournament.

 Champion   Runners-up   Third place

FIFA World Cup

AFC Asian Cup

FIFA Arab Cup

West Asian Football Federation Championship

Gulf Cup

Pan Arab Games

Asian Games

FIFA Confederations Cup

All-time results

The following table shows Saudi Arabia's all-time international record, correct as of 12 January 2023.

 world football.net
 FIFA.com

Honours

International
FIFA Confederations Cup:
Runner-up: 1992
Fourth Place: 1999

Continental
AFC Asian Cup:
Winner: 1984, 1988, 1996
Runner-up: 1992, 2000, 2007
Asian Games
Silver Medalists: 1986
Bronze Medalists: 1982

Regional
Arabian Gulf Cup:
Winner: 1994, 2002, 2003–04
Runner-up: 1972, 1974, 1998, 2009, 2010, 2014, 2019
Third Place:  1970, 1979, 1984, 1986, 1988, 1992, 1996, 2007

Arab Cup:
Winner: 1998, 2002
Runner-up: 1992
Third Place: 1985
Fourth Place: 2012

Pan Arab Games
Silver Medalists: 1976
Bronze Medalists: 2007

Other
Afro-Asian Cup of Nations:
Runner-up: 1985, 1997

Islamic Solidarity Games
Gold Medalists: 2005

Titles

AFC Asian Cup

FIFA Arab Cup

Arabian Gulf Cup

Notes

References

External links

FIFA profile
Saudi Arabia national football team website
Saudi Arabia in fifaworldcup.com
Saudi Arabia in WC 2022

 
AFC Asian Cup-winning countries
Asian national association football teams